John Llewellyn Saunders  (1891–1961) was a notable New Zealand dentist and public health administrator. He was born in Dunedin, New Zealand in 1891.

In the 1956 New Year Honours, Saunders was appointed a Commander of the Order of the British Empire.

References

1891 births
1961 deaths
New Zealand public servants
New Zealand dentists
New Zealand Commanders of the Order of the British Empire
New Zealand Companions of the Distinguished Service Order
People from Dunedin in health professions
20th-century dentists